Mo Tat is a small village in the southern part of Lamma Island, Hong Kong, on the spur of land that juts east and faces Aberdeen. The village is composed of three different areas: Mo Tat Wan along the beach, Mo Tat Sun Tsuen on the hill and Mo Tat or Mo Tat Old Village in the valley.

The village has no shops or commercial centre, although there is a restaurant near the ferry pier.

Administration
Mo Tat and Mo Tat Wan are recognized villages under the New Territories Small House Policy.

Rejected luxury real estate plan
Mainland China-based Agile Property Holdings had proposed in 2011 a private luxury development with a large 500-yacht marina, one 120-room hotel, 900 upmarket residential units across Tung O Wan to the northern part of the bay. The size of this rejected project was to be equal to 125 standard football fields. 

The development site boundary would only have been 200 to 300 metres away from Sham Wan, a nesting ground for the endangered green turtle in the south of Lamma which is listed by the government as a "site of special scientific interest" with restricted entry. Alan Leung Sze-lun, senior conservation officer for WWF Hong Kong, said his group was very worried about the project's impact on the endangered species.

Transport
There is a public ferry running between Aberdeen and Sok Kwu Wan via Mo Tat operated by Chuen Kee Ferry. Ferries run to Central from Sok Kwu Wan, a village also 20 minutes by foot from Mo Tat.

References

External links

 Delineation of area of existing village Mo Tat (Lamma South) for election of resident representative (2019 to 2022)
 Delineation of area of existing village Mo Tat Wan (Lamma South) for election of resident representative (2019 to 2022)

Lamma Island
Villages in Islands District, Hong Kong